The Busch All-Star Tour was a NASCAR-sanctioned dirt track late model racing series. The series, based in the Midwestern United States, started in 1985 and folded in 2002, and was NASCAR's only national dirt racing series.

History
The series held its first race at Adams County Speedway in Corning, Iowa, and was won by Steve Kosiski. Kosiski became the most successful driver in series history with 50 victories and seven championships; his brother Joe was the second most successful driver, with 45 wins and five championships. Although the tour was primarily situated in the Midwest, the series also expanded to tracks outside the region. Among the tracks that played host to Busch All-Star Tour races included Lakeside Speedway, I-80 Speedway, Eagle Raceway, I-70 Speedway, Hawkeye Downs Speedway and Iowa State Fair Speedway The series was eventually renamed the O'Reilly Auto Parts All-Star Series, and the tour was discontinued after 2002 by NASCAR, as it decided to shift its focus to its Weekly Racing Series (now the Whelen All-American Series). NASCAR's top national series didn't return to dirt until the Camping World Truck Series ran the 2013 Mudsummer Classic at Eldora Speedway.

Notable people
Notable personnel who worked with the tour included John Darby, the current Sprint Cup Series director, who worked as chief technical inspector for the tour, along with Motor Racing Network writer Pete Pistone, who served as public relations director for approximately four seasons. The Series Director, throughout the entire 17-year run of the series, was Jim Wilson, a 23-year NASCAR veteran, who later went on to found the WORLD Dirt Racing League.  Among the noted winners in the series included 2000 Weekly Racing Series national champion Gary Webb, Xfinity Series driver Mike Wallace and former Cup Series driver Ken Schrader.

List of series champions

See also
 Lucas Oil Late Model Dirt Series
 World of Outlaws Late Model Series

References

Dirt track racing in the United States
NASCAR series